François Mahé (September 2, 1930 – May 31, 2015) was a French professional road bicycle racer. He was professional from 1950 to 1965. Highlights from his career include one day in the yellow jersey as leader of the general classification in the 1953 Tour de France, a stage win in 1954 Tour de France as well as a stage win in Vuelta a España, Paris–Nice, Tour de Luxembourg and the Critérium du Dauphiné Libéré and coming second in the 1952 edition of the GP Ouest-France and the 1954 edition of Tour of Flanders.

Major results

1953
Tour de France:
Wearing yellow jersey for one day
10th place overall classification
1954
Tour de France:
Winner stage 21A
1955
Malansec
Tour de France:
10th place overall classification
1958
Querrien
1959
Bain-de-Bretagne
Tour de France:
5th place overall classification
1960
Brest
Camors
Chauffailles
Ploudalmezeau
1961
Vuelta a España:
Winner stages 2 and 14
1962
Maël-Carhaix
Plévin
1963
GP de Cannes
1965
Grandchamps

References

External links 
Palmarès of François Mahé

Official Tour de France results for François Mahé

1930 births
French male cyclists
French Tour de France stage winners
French Vuelta a España stage winners
Sportspeople from Morbihan
2015 deaths
Cyclists from Brittany